BMW M GmbH, formerly known as BMW Motorsport GmbH, is a subsidiary of BMW AG that manufactures high-performance cars.

BMW M ("M" for "motorsport") was initially created to facilitate BMW's racing program, which was very successful in the 1960s and 1970s. As time passed, BMW M began to supplement BMW's vehicle portfolio with specially modified higher trim models, for which they are now most known by the general public. These M-badged cars traditionally include modified engines, transmissions, suspensions, interior trims, aerodynamics, and exterior modifications to set them apart from their counterparts. All M models are tested and tuned at BMW's private facility at the Nürburgring racing circuit in Germany.

BMW M also provides M packages for the BMW S1000RR motorcycle, with a limited-production 2021-onwards homologation-special, race-type machine designated M1000RR.

History

Origins

Established in May 1972 with 35 employees,  it grew to 400 employees by 1988, and is currently an integral part of BMW's market presence. The first racing project was BMW's 3.0 CSL. After this came the BMW 530MLE in 1976. It was designed to compete in South Africa's Modified Production Series instead of the regular E12 528i. 100 homologated road cars had to be produced for this.

After the success of BMW M products like BMW 3.0 CSL in racing venues and the growing market for high performance sports cars, M introduced cars for sale to the public. The first official M-badged car for sale to the public was the M1, revealed at the Paris Motor Show in 1978.  The M1, however, was more of a racecar in domestic trim than an everyday driver. The direction of the M cars changed with the 1979 release of the M535i, which was a high performance version of BMW's popular 5 Series mid-size sedan.

In 1993, BMW Motorsport GmbH changed their name to BMW M GmbH.

BMW Motorsport GmbH supplied the 6.1-litre V12 DOHC 48 valve engine that powers the McLaren F1, which, like its engine supplier and manufacturer, has enjoyed plenty of racing success, famously winning the 24 Hours of Le Mans in 1995, the first year of competition for the GTR racing variant.

Recent history
At present, BMW M has offered modified versions of nearly every BMW nameplate, except for the Z1, 7 Series flagship luxury sedan and the X1 compact crossover SUVs. There is no BMW M version of the 7 Series, as BMW did not want its flagship saloon to be powered by a high-revving engine, and as the recent top-performing versions (usually the BMW 760Li) have V12 engines which while powerful are considered too heavy for a sporty offshoot. So far the unofficial "BMW M7" is the Alpina B7, which is produced on BMW's assembly line though its engine and finishing touches are done by auto tuner Alpina. However, as BMW M shifted to turbocharged engines, there are rumors that there is an in-house BMW M7 in the works, and it is speculated that its performance may exceed that of the BMW 760Li and Alpina B7.

The BMW X5 and X6 sport activity vehicles received M derivatives for the 2010 model year onwards. These are the first M vehicles with xDrive four-wheel drive and automatic transmissions, and also the first M-badged SUV models. However, the E70 and E71 X5 and X6 M were actually developed by BMW Group rather than by BMW M.

Although these are considered the most well known in-house tuning divisions, BMW M has a considerably different philosophy than Mercedes-AMG. BMW M has emphasized tuning only vehicles with "Lateral agility" (which has long been the 3 Series, 5 Series, and roadsters), while AMG has created high-performance versions of many of its nameplates, including flagship sedans and SUVs. Accordingly, "an M car has to be responsive and fundamentally keen on turning as well as accelerating. The M5's technical spec is all about connecting the driver to a car that reacts blindingly fast, whatever request the driver hands down." Until the 2010 model year, BMW M has also never used supercharging or turbocharging, unlike Mercedes-AMG or Audi; for instance the E39 and E60 iterations of the BMW M5 (using naturally-aspirated engines) competed against the Mercedes-Benz E55 AMG (with a supercharged V8) and the Audi RS6 (twin-turbo).

BMW M vehicles typically use manual and automatic transmissions (the most recent type being a dual-clutch transmission), in contrast to Mercedes-AMG which largely has automatic transmissions (the 7-speed AMG SpeedShift MCT, which is a multi-clutch automatic transmission, but not a dual-clutch transmission, was used on new models from 2009 onward). However, the North American market E36 M3s in sedan and convertible form were the first M-vehicles offered with a traditional torque-converter automatic transmission.

BMW M engines were traditionally large displacement naturally aspirated high revving engines, particularly the S85 V10 in the E60 M5 and E63 M6 and the related S65 V8 in the E90 M3. These are the most powerful engines BMW has ever built (not including the BMW S70/2) without supercharging or turbocharging, with an output of 100 hp per liter of displacement, and each has won numerous International Engine of the Year Awards. As late as the early 2000s, BMW regarded forced-induction (supercharging or turbocharging) as low-tech shortcuts to boosting horsepower, stating that this adds weight and complexity while reducing throttle response. BMW purists have noted that while forced induction and/or large displacement does produce more torque for better day-to-day driving, most of them like the "character" and sound of low displacement naturally aspirated engines with high redlines.

However, the late 2000s international regulations trends on reducing  emissions and fuel consumption are cited as the reasons not to continue further development on naturally aspirated high redline engines. The N54 twin-turbo inline-6 which debuted in the 2007 BMW 335i (E90) gives almost equivalent performance to the E46 and E90 iterations of the BMW M3, while being much more practical and fuel-efficient as a daily driver. Starting with the X5 M and X6 M, and featured in the F10 M5, BMW used the twin-turbocharged S63 which not only produces more horsepower and torque, but is also more efficient than the S85 V10. Also unlike the S85 and S65 which do not share a design with non-M BMW engines, the S63 has significant parts commonality with the base N63 V8 engine (which is also has twin turbochargers) making them less expensive to build. BMW has not yet considered supercharging.

From 2013, the BMW M3 (E92/E93) is the only "traditional" M car left, as the rest of the list features turbocharged engines, and the next iteration of the M3 (F80) and M4 (F82/F83) features a twin-turbocharged straight-6 engine.

M cars versus M-badged cars
Apart from the pinnacle M versions of each model, BMW Motorsport also offers "M Sport" accessories upgrades to cars in its lineup. This single purchase option, which is superior to the standard Sports Package, includes a more sporty suspension, sports steering wheel and gearshift, fully-adjustable sport seats, sports wheels and a sports aerodynamic package. Cars with the "M Sport" option, while not being the pinnacle M model of each series are considerably sportier than the stock model.

Vehicles with the "M Sport" upgrade feature smaller M badges on the wheels, front fenders, steering wheel, gearshift and door sills, whilst fully-fledged M cars have larger "M" badges on the grille and/or trunk, wheels, steering wheel, gearshift and door sills with the model number (e.g., "M4" or "M5"). The exceptions include the M Roadster and M Coupe models, both Z3, Z4 and 1 Series variants, which only have an "M" badge with no number displayed on the boot. However, these cars are still proper M cars.

BMW has offered these 'M Sport' options on their standard vehicles since the late 1970s which explains why these vehicles carry M badges straight from the factory. In comparison, vehicle maker Audi also employs this same type of nomenclature. There are fully fledged 'S' models (S4, S5, S6, S7 and TTS), as well as an optional 'S'-line package that can be equipped to their standard vehicle lineup.

An example of 'M'-badged vehicles in recent times includes the 5 Series and 6 Series only having a choice of either a manual or automatic transmission, but the 'M' Sport package had an optional Sequential Sport Gearbox (SSG) (a gearbox similar to the M5 and M6 (SMG)) until after the 2007 model year.

Exclusive M cars 
Two models, the M1 (1978–1981) and XM (2022–present), are not pinnacle versions of an existing BMW model, but rather, are ground-up performance models produced and sold exclusively in their M variant. Sometimes labelled as "M Original" cars, these models represent flagship performance and design for the M brand.

M Performance models
In 2012 BMW introduced a new category for M cars, branded as M Performance, designed “to bridge the gap between M Sport variants and the outright M high-performance models.“ The lineup included the diesel-powered M550d in saloon and touring body styles, X5 M50d, and X6 M50d, marking the first diesel-powered BMW models to ever carry M-badging. The gasoline-powered M135i debuted shortly after. 

BMW has since announced M Performance variants of nearly every model in their lineup, including three new electric models, the i4, ix and the i7.

Exceptions
The 2010 X5 and X6-based M vehicles bore their normal model designations followed by the "M" stripe badge (the X5 M and X6 M). If the nomenclature followed tradition, then they would have had an MX5 and MX6, already used by Mazda.
The Z3-based M Roadster and M Coupe bore numberless "M" badges as standard fitment.
The first generation Z4-based Z4 M Roadster and Z4 M Coupe bore their normal model designations followed by the "M" stripe badge (the Z4 M Roadster and Z4 M Coupe).
The M635CSi followed the M535i naming tradition but was a fully-fledged M-Car (the M6).
The BMW 1 Series-based M cars is called the BMW 1 Series M Coupe to avoid confusion with the original BMW M1.

List of Cars

Current M Original cars 

 XM – G09 (2022–)

Current M cars
M2 – G87 coupé (2023–)
M3 – G80 saloon, G81 estate (2021–)
M4 – G82 coupé, G83 cabriolet (2021–)
M5 – F90 saloon (2017–)
M8 – F92 coupé, F91 convertible, F93 Gran Coupé (2019–)
X3 M – F97 (2019–)
X4 M – F98 (2019–)
X5 M – F95 (2020–)
X6 M – F96 (2020–)

Current M Performance models
i4 M50 xDrive - G26 BEV gran coupé (2021–)
M135i xDrive – F40 five-door hatchback (2019–)
M235i xDrive - F44 gran coupé (2019–)
M240i xDrive - G42 coupé (2021-)
M340i/M340i xDrive and M340d xDrive - G20 saloon and G21 estate (2019–)
M440i xDrive and M440d xDrive - G22 coupé and G23 convertible (2020–)
M550i xDrive and M550d xDrive - G30 saloon and G31 estate (2017–)
M760Li xDrive - G12 saloon (2017–)
M760e xDrive - G70 saloon (2023–)
M850i xDrive - G14 convertible, G15 coupé, and G16 gran coupé (2019–)
X2 M35i - F39 (2019–)
X3 M40i and X3 M40d - G01 (2018–)
X4 M40i and X4 M40d - G02 (2018–)
X5 M50i and X5 M50d - G05 (2019–)
X6 M50i and X6 M50d - G06 (2019–)
X7 M50i and X7 M50d - G07 (2019–)
Z4 M40i - G29 (2019–)

Previous M cars

M-badged cars
All these cars are true BMW Motorsport models, not M-line sport models that bear BMW Motorsport features such as sport body kits, and interior specs.

E12 M535i (1979–1981) – often considered the first mass-production vehicle built by BMW Motorsport
E31 850CSi (1992–1996) – an M car in all but name; it had a BMW M–sourced engine and its VIN indicated that it was developed by BMW Motorsport, like all other M cars.

M-engined cars
In the late 1980s, due to prohibitive taxes for cars above 2.0-litres of engine displacement in Italy and Portugal, BMW decided to build the E30 320is as an alternative to the 2.3-litre M3. This car was equipped with a shorter stroke S14 engine and produced 192 PS. BMW produced a total of 3648 units between 9/1987 and 11/1990 of which a majority of 2542 units were made available in two-door form (code name AK95). No catalytic converters were installed on this limited version. The steering rack, springs, shock absorbers, and brakes were similar to the normal E30 6-cylinder models (i.e. 325i) with sports suspension. The engine was mated to a Getrag 265 5-speed transmission in dog-leg configuration.

Competition
Audi's RS models, Mercedes-Benz's AMG models, and Lexus F models are often reviewed in direct competition to a similarly sized BMW M car, such as the Lexus IS-F vs. Audi RS4 vs. Mercedes C63 AMG vs. BMW M3.

In contrast to aftermarket tuners, Alpina BMW-based cars are currently mostly built by BMW on its production lines and are more comfort-oriented. Alpina is recognized as a car manufacturer and works very closely with BMW, sometimes participating in the development of BMW models and engines. Some Alpina models are even sold in North-America by BMW and either compete with the BMW M6 Gran Coupé, in the case of the Alpina B6 Gran Coupé, or replace them, in the case of the Alpina B7 as there is no M7 variant of the 7 Series to compete with the model.

BMW M also faces competition from several independent companies offering their own performance versions of BMW models; some performance packs can be retrofitted to existing cars while others are applied to new cars bought directly from BMW AG and converted prior to first registration. Such companies include Hamann Motorsport, Dinan Cars, G-Power, AC Schnitzer and Hartge.

See also
 BMW in motorsport
 BMW Motorsport
 BMW model designations
 History of BMW
 Audi S and RS models
 Mercedes-AMG
 Alfa Romeo Quadrifoglio

References

External links

 BMW M: Home of high performance cars 
 BMW Motorsport (competition) website

BMW
Automotive companies established in 1972
Official motorsports and performance division of automakers
1972 establishments in West Germany